"Forget Me Not" is Bonnie Pink's eighth single and first from the album Evil & Flowers. The single was released under the Pony Canyon label on March 4, 1998.

Track listing
Forget Me Not
The Last Thing I Can Do
Forget Me Not (Instrumental)

Oricon Sales Chart

1998 singles
1998 songs
Bonnie Pink songs
Pony Canyon singles
Songs written by Bonnie Pink